Emily Morgan may refer to:

 Emily D. West (c. 1815–1891), also known as Emily Morgan, Texas folk heroine who has come to be identified with the song "The Yellow Rose of Texas"
 Emily Morgan (nurse) (1878–1960), nurse known as the "Angel of the Yukon"
 Emily Malbone Morgan (1862–1937), social and religious leader in the Episcopal Church in the United States
 Emily Morgan (General Hospital)